James Bromley (1800–1838), was an English mezzotint-engraver.

Bromley was the third son of William Bromley, the line-engraver. Little is known respecting his life. Among his best plates may be enumerated portraits of the Duchess of Kent, after George Hayter; John, Earl Russell, after Hayter; and the Earl of Carlisle, when Lord Morpeth, after Thomas Heathfield Carrick; 'Falstaff,' after Henry Liverseege; and 'La Zingarella,' after Octavius Oakley. He exhibited twelve of his works at the Suffolk Street Gallery between 1829 and 1833. He died on 12 December 1838.

References

External links

John and James Bromley, Victorian artists website, accessed 30 January 2018

1800 births
1838 deaths
English engravers
19th-century artists